Trey Lewis may refer to:

 Trey Lewis (American football) (born 1985), American football player
 Trey Lewis (tennis) (born 1959), American tennis player
 Trey Lewis (basketball) (born 1992), American basketball player
 Trey Lewis (singer) (born c. 1987), American country music singer